"Boiled Beef and Carrots" is a comedic music hall song published in 1909. It was composed by Charles Collins and Fred Murray. The song was made famous by Harry Champion who sang it as part of his act and later recorded it. The song extols the virtues of a typical English, and particularly Cockney, dish.

Chorus:

"Derby Kell" is old Cockney rhyming slang for belly ("Derby Kelly"). "Blow out your kite" means "fill your stomach". It uses the word kite (also kyte), a dialect word, originally derived from an Old English word for the womb which, by extension, came to mean the belly.

See also
 Boiled beef

References

British pop songs
Comedy songs
1909 songs
Music hall songs
Songs with music by Charles Collins (songwriter)